Maria de la Paz Pardo de Tavera y Gorricho (died 3 or 6 October 1892) was a Philippine mestiza and wife of Filipino painter Juan Luna. Though born in the Philippines, she and her family moved to Paris some time after her father Félix's death in 1864. She had two children with Luna: Andrés and María de la Paz, though the latter died when she was three years old.

On 22 September 1892, after being accused of adultery, de Tavera was shot by Luna in their atelier in  alongside her mother Juliana Gorricho and her brother Félix, with the latter surviving the incident. De Tavera died from her gunshot wounds eleven days after the said incident, in a hospital.

Notes

References

External link

1860s births
1892 deaths
19th-century Filipino women
Deaths by firearm in France
Filipino expatriates in France
Filipino people of Portuguese descent